False Alarms is a 1936 short subject directed by Del Lord starring American slapstick comedy team The Three Stooges (Moe Howard, Larry Fine and Curly Howard). It is the 17th entry in the series released by Columbia Pictures starring the comedians, who released 190 shorts for the studio between 1934 and 1959.

Plot
The Stooges are firemen who are constantly getting in trouble due to taking too much off duty nights with women. After missing their umpteenth fire call, they are warned by their superior Captain Ashe (Stanley Blystone) that one more incident will cost them their jobs. They then proceeded back to work, in this case, cleaning the fire hoses. In the midst of the action, a new coupé that Captain Ashe has purchased is delivered to the station. Curly rolls out the hoses into the street, where the hoses are cut by passing streetcars. When the three discover the cut off pieces, Curly deems them “little baby hoses” and starts naming them after the young Dionne quintuplets. In frustration, Moe wrings Curly’s hands on the wringers and he and Larry start spanking Curly with the cut-off fire hoses which almost costs them their jobs.

Meanwhile, Curly sneaks out to visit his girlfriend Maisie (Beatrice Curtis) to celebrate her birthday despite the restrictions. She has two friends who need dates, so Curly tries to get Moe and Larry to join him. The two other girls are named Mimi (Beatrice Blinn) and Minnie (June Gittelson), the latter being tall, heavy set, and quite determined to secure a boyfriend. She even aggressively pursues a very reluctant Curly when it becomes apparent that the restrictions are going to prevent Moe and Larry from joining the party. Larry attempts to go anyway, but is stopped by Moe at the fire pole by pulling his hair. Moe then goes to the stock room holding Larry by the hair, and locks the door to prevent Larry from leaving. But Larry fights back, and the key goes into the sink in the melee. Moe then proceeds to use Larry as a plunger to retrieve the key. Just then, Curly realizes that the only way he knows to get Moe and Larry out of the fire station is to pull a fire alarm, so he decides to activate it. The firemen respond to the call, but without Larry and Moe. Realizing the alarm, they force themselves out, and down through the fire pole. They find that the firemen have left them, so they decide to use Captain Ashe's new coupé.

They go to the alarm location, finding Curly and the three girlfriends waiting for them. Moe is irate about the false alarm, but sensing the approaching fire truck (and Captain Ashe), they decide to take the coupé back to the station. All six ride in the car with Curly driving crazily through town, dodging cars and streetcars until they hit a lamppost thanks to Curly's stupidity and distraction. All the passengers are trapped in the trunk except for Moe who lands outside. Moe, assisted by concerned pedestrians, retrieves them out of the car, but with their egos bruised, the three girlfriends scoot off in a huff. However, before this happens, Minnie (sporting a large black eye) gets into a comical face slapping match with Curly.

The Stooges push the battered coupé out of the accident scene, but forget to shut it off. The car goes in its own power across the street, back into the fire station. It goes out again, and Captain Ashe realizes that it is his car that is in trouble. The car ends up in the back of an open Bekins van, and as the Stooges close the door, the car's engine explodes. The fire truck, with the angry Captain Ashe and the whole fire crew out to kill them by using fire hooks and fire axes as melee weapons starts chasing the Stooges. Sensing Ashe, they escape in the van, smoking car and all.

Production notes
False Alarms was filmed on location in Los Angeles, California on May 19–22, 1936. The following landmarks appear in the film:
 Fire station: Engine No. 61 and Truck No. 61 (at 5821 West 3rd Street)
 Carl X Folsom Modern Motor Service (at 200 North Larchmont Boulevard)
 Max Factor Make-up Studio
 Remington Rand, Inc.
 Safeway Stores
 Ashley Apartments
 Bekins movers
 Ozarks Drugstore
 Los Angeles Railway trolley No. 400
 Silvertown Tires

References

External links
 
 
 False Alarms at threestooges.net

1936 films
1936 comedy films
The Three Stooges films
Films about firefighting
American black-and-white films
Films directed by Del Lord
Columbia Pictures short films
American comedy short films
1930s English-language films
1930s American films